Inocente de Ti (English: Innocent of You) is the 26th studio album recorded by Mexican singer-songwriter Juan Gabriel. It was released by BMG U.S. Latin Latin on October 21, 2003 (see 2003 in music) . It was also the theme song for a Mexican telenovela Inocente de Tí (2004-2005), produced by Nathalie Lartilleux, Camila Sodi and Valentino Lanús, starred as protagonists, while Helena Rojo and Carolina Tejera starred as antagonists. Lupita Ferrer and Ricardo Blume starred as stellar performances. The song Yo Te Recuerdo was used as the theme song of the telenovela Mariana de la Noche (2003-2004), produced by Salvador Mejía, but with a different musical arrangement. Alejandra Barros and Jorge Salinas starred as protagonists, while César Évora and Angélica Rivera, starred as antagonists. The album received a nomination Latin Grammy Award for Best Singer-Songwriter Album in 5th Annual Latin Grammy Awards, losing yo Soraya by Soraya.

Track listing

Chart performance

Sales and certifications

References 

Juan Gabriel albums
Latin Grammy Award for Best Singer-Songwriter Album
2003 albums
Spanish-language albums